Werner Gouws (born 10 February 2000) is a South African rugby union player for the  in the Currie Cup. His regular position is flanker.

Gouws was named in the  side for the 2022 Currie Cup Premier Division.

References

South African rugby union players
Living people
Rugby union flankers
Blue Bulls players
2000 births
Rugby union players from Port Elizabeth
Griquas (rugby union) players